The Siminovitch Prize is Canada's largest theatre award recognizing excellence in mid-career directors, playwrights and designers. $100,000 is awarded annually, and for recipients, who are given the public recognition and financial resources, it is truly life-changing!  

Anyone may nominate a qualified candidate for the Prize, and winners are selected by a jury made up of prominent theatre professionals. Nominees must be a professional director, playwright, or designer who, in the preceding 10 years, has made a significant creative contribution to no fewer than three noteworthy theatre projects in Canada.

A condition of the award is that one quarter of the prize (CAD$25,000) must be awarded to an emerging artist "Protégé" selected by the winner. The Protégé must be an individual involved in professional direction, playwriting, or design in Canadian theatre. The winner may choose to grant the amount to a single Protégé or divide it between two eligible Protégés. Three finalists also receive CAD$5,000.

History
Formally, the Elinore & Lou Siminovitch Prize in Theatre, the Siminovitch Prize was launched in 2000 to honour the values and achievements of the distinguished scientist Louis ("Lou") Siminovitch and his late wife Elinore Siminovitch who was a pioneering playwright. A group of Dr. Siminovitch’s friends and colleagues came together on the occasion of his 80th birthday to create this award . Twelve individuals and six organizations founded the prize; primary amongst them was the prize's largest financial sponsor, the BMO Financial Group.

In March 2012, BMO announced that the 12th edition of the prize would be its last. In an interview one of the prize's founders, Joseph Rotman, he stated that the Siminovitch Prize was never conceived to run in perpetuity. However, in July 2013, new financial supporters were secured resulting in the revival of the Siminovitch Prize. The Prize has continued ever since, under the direction of the Siminovitch Prize Foundation, funded annually by individual donors and corporate sponsors.

Recipients
The recipients of the Siminovitch Prize since its inception are:

2001 (director) - Daniel Brooks
2002 (playwright) - Carole Fréchette
2003 (designer) - Louise Campeau
2004 (director) - Jillian Keiley
2005 (playwright) - John Mighton
2006 (designer) - Dany Lyne
2007 (director) - Brigitte Haentjens
2008 (playwright) - Daniel MacIvor
2009 (designer) - Ronnie Burkett
2010 (director) - Kim Collier
2011 (playwright) - Joan MacLeod
2012 (designer) - Robert Thomson
2013 (director) - Chris Abraham (the only laureate to receive both the protégé and main prize) 
2014 (playwright) - Olivier Choinière
2015 (designer) - Anick La Bissonnière
2016 (director) - Nadia Ross 
2017 (playwright) - Marcus Youssef of Vancouver
2018 (designer) - Stéphanie Jasmin of Montreal
2019 (directors) - Maiko Yamamoto and James Long
2020 (playwright) - Tara Beagan
2021 (designer) - Gillian Gallow
2022 (director) - Marie Brassard

The protégé recipients of the Siminovitch prize are:

2001 - Chris Abraham
2002 - Geneviève Billet
2003 - Magalie Amyot and Michèle Magnon
2004 - Danielle Irvine
2005 - Anton Piatigorsky
2006 - Camellia Koo and April Anne Viczko
2007 - Christian Lapointe
2008 - Daniel Arnold and Medina Hahn
2009 - Clea Minaker
2010 - Anita Rochon
2011 - Anusree Roy
2012 - Jason Hand and Raha Javanfar
2013 - Mitchell Cushman
2014 - Annick Lefebvre
2015 - Marilène Bastien
2016 - Shaista Laif and Sarah Conn
2017 - Christine Quintana
2018 - Max-Otto Fauteux
2019 - Conor Wylie
2020 - Joelle Peters
2021 - Joyce Padua and Joshua Quinlan
2022 - Philippe Boutin

References

External links
Official website

Canadian theatre awards
Awards established in 2001